England competed at the 2014 Commonwealth Games in Glasgow, Scotland, between 23 July and 3 August 2014. Commonwealth Games England named a team of 416 athletes consisting of 216 men and 200 women across the 18 disciplines.

Administration
On 11 September 2013, Commonwealth Games England announced the appointment of Chef-de-Mission Jan Paterson and her support team.
 Jan Paterson – Chef-de-Mission
 Graeme Dell – Deputy Chef-de-Mission for operations
 Hilda Gibson – Deputy Chef-de-Mission for planning
 Don Parker – Deputy Chef-de-Mission for sport
 Claire Furlong – Head of media
 Mo Diprose – Head of commercial operations
On 20 November 2013, Commonwealth Games England announced the appointment of Team Leaders for the 18 sports.
 Alexei Evangulov – Aquatics–Diving
 Dawn Peart – Aquatics–Swimming
 Peter Stanley – Athletics
 Jens Grill – Badminton
 John Hallam – Boxing
 Keith Reynolds – Cycling
 Mike Weinstock – Gymnastics
 Danny Kerry – Hockey
 Karen Roberts – Judo
 John Bell – Lawn bowls
 Sarah Gandon – Netball
 Nadine Cooke – Rugby 7s
 Martyn White – Shooting
 Louise Pickford – Squash
 John Pett – Table tennis
 James Taylor – Triathlon
 Maggie Lynes – Weightlifting
 Shaun Morley – Wrestling

Medallists

| style="text-align:left; vertical-align:top;"|

Athletics

On 14 May 2014, Commonwealth Games England announced that Steve Way and Amy Whitehead had been selected to compete in the men's and women's marathons respectively. On 16 June, Commonwealth Games England announced a track and field team of 129 athletes including the previously selected marathon runners. On 8 July, Commonwealth Games England announced that heptathlete Morgan Lake had withdrawn from the team to concentrate on the World Junior Athletics Championships. Grace Clements has been selected to replace her. Following medical advice heptathlete Katarina Johnson-Thompson withdrew from the team due to injury on 21 July. On the eve of the opening ceremony, sprinter Dwain Chambers announced his withdrawal from the 4 × 100 metres relay squad, to concentrate on running the individual 100 metres at the 2014 European Athletics Championships in Zurich eight days later. On the same day, Jessica Tappin was announced as Johnson-Thompson's replacement in the heptathlon. Meghan Beesley (400m hurdles) and Chris Thompson (10000m) withdrew due to injury. Laura Wake was named as a replacement for Beesley. Having been selected to compete in the 5000m and 10000m at the European Athletics Championships, Jo Pavey withdrew from the 10000m, although she still competed in the 5000m. Kate Avery was selected to replace her in the 10000m. On the first day of the Games it was announced that Mo Farah CBE had withdrawn from the team due to illness.

Men

Track & road events

Field Events

Combined events – Decathlon

Women

Track & road events

Field events

Combined events – Heptathlon

Badminton

On 5 June Commonwealth Games England named a squad of 10 to compete in Glasgow.

Individual

Doubles

Mixed team

Pool F

Quarterfinal

Semifinal

Final

Boxing

Commonwealth Games England named a squad of 11 boxers on 18 June.

Men

 Sekabembe was disqualified after failing his medical test. Joyce was thus sent through to the final automatically.

Women

Cycling

A squad of 31 cyclists was announced by Commonwealth Games England on 11 June. On 27 June British Cycling in collaboration with Team England confirmed that Sir Bradley Wiggins would compete on the track as well as in the road events. On 18 July, Commonwealth Games England announced that Jon Dibben had withdrawn from both the road and track teams due to injury. While he was not replaced in the track team a substitute could be named to the road squad. Russell Downing was named as the replacement for Dibben, while Sir Bradley Wiggins revealed that he would only compete in the track events at the Games. David Fletcher withdrew due to injury and was replaced by Liam Killeen in the men's mountain biking.

Road

Track
Sprint

Pursuit

Time trial

Points race

Scratch race

Keirin

Mountain bike

Diving

On 13 June Commonwealth Games England announced a squad of 15 divers. In addition it was revealed that permission had been sought from the Commonwealth Games Federation to include 13-year-old Victoria Vincent – the British 10m platform diving champion – in the squad as she failed to meet the minimum age criteria of 14 for most international diving events. On 19 June it was confirmed that permission had been granted for her to compete and as a consequence she was the youngest member of England's team in Glasgow. On  18 July, Commonwealth Games England announced that Daniel Goodfellow and Matty Lee had both withdrawn from the diving squad due to injury and would not be replaced.

Men

Women

Gymnastics

On 17 June Commonwealth Games England named a squad of 10 artistic and 3 rhythmic gymnasts.

Artistic

Men
All-around

Individual events

 Sam Oldham originally qualified but pulled out due to injury. He was replaced by Nile Wilson who qualified in reserve.
 Sam Oldham originally qualified but pulled out due to injury. He was replaced by Kristian Thomas who qualified in reserve.

Women
All-around

Individual events

Rhythmic

All-around

Individual finals

Hockey

Two squads totalling 32 players were named by England Hockey on 27 June. On 18 July, Commonwealth Games England announced that Tim Whiteman had withdrawn from the men's team due to injury with Ollie Willars named as his replacement.

Men's tournament

The men's squad consists of:

Alastair Brogdon
Nicholas Catlin
David Condon
Adam Dixon
Daniel Fox
Mark Gleghorne
Michael Hoare
Ashley Jackson
Iain Lewers
Simon Mantell
Harry Martin
Barry Middleton (Captain)
George Pinner (GK)
Phil Roper
Henry Weir
Ollie Willars

Pool B

Semifinal

Bronze final

Women's tournament

The women's squad consists of:

Giselle Ansley
Sophie Bray
Alex Danson
Susie Gilbert
Maddie Hinch (GK)
Lily Owsley
Sam Quek
Kate Richardson-Walsh (Captain)
Zoe Shipperley
Susannah Townsend
Georgie Twigg
Laura Unsworth
Ellie Watton
Hollie Webb
Nicola White
Lucy Wood

Pool B

Semifinal

Final

Judo

Commonwealth Games England confirmed that a squad of 14 judoka has been selected on 13 May. On 18 July, Commonwealth Games England announced that Ben Fletcher (100 kg) had withdrawn from the team due to injury and that a replacement would be nominated. The following day, Commonwealth Games England announced that Danny Williams (73 kg) had been selected to replace him. Caroline Kinane (78 kg) has withdrawn due to injury and been replaced by Katie Jemima Yeats-Brown (63 kg).

Men

Women

Lawn bowls

On 30 May Commonwealth Games England announced the selection of a squad of 15 bowlers and 2 directors to assist the visually impaired competitors in the B2/B3 Mixed Pair. On the same day Bowls England confirmed that "the two directors are classed as athletes for the first time and will be eligible to receive any medals won."
Men

Women

Para-bowls

Netball

On 1 July, England Netball named a squad of 12 to compete in Glasgow. In the absence of current captain Pamela Cookey due to injury Jade Clarke led the team.

The squad consists of Ama Agbeze, Sara Bayman, Eboni Beckford-Chambers, Jade Clarke (Captain), Kadeen Corbin, Sasha Corbin, Rachel Dunn, Stacey Francis, Serena Guthrie, Joanne Harten, Helen Housby and Geva Mentor.

Pool B

Semifinal

Bronze final

Rugby sevens

The Rugby Football Union announced their squad of 12 for the Commonwealth Games on 10 July.

The squad consists of Dan Bibby, John Brake, Mark Bright, Phil Burgess, Mike Ellery, Charlie Hayter, Christian Lewis-Platt, Tom Mitchell (Captain), Dan Norton, Tom Powell, James Rodwell and Marcus Watson.

Pool D

Quarterfinal

Plate competition semifinal

Plate competition final

Shooting

British Shooting announced the squad for some of the rifle and pistol events on 23 April with the remainder of the squad to be named on 8 May. The squad for the clay target events was eventually announced on 10 June.

Men
Pistol/Small bore

Shotgun

Full bore

Women
Pistol/Small bore

Shotgun

Squash

Initially England Squash & Racketball announced a squad of 9 for the games on 4 June. Sarah Kippax was later added to the team on 16 June.
Individual

Doubles

Swimming

On 7 May Commonwealth Games England announced a squad of 39 swimmers consisting of 20 men and 19 women.

Men

 Nick Grainger finished in equal eighth position in the heats alongside Canada's Ryan Cochrane and Ieuan Lloyd from Wales. A swim-off was held between the three competitors which Grainger won and was awarded with the eighth and last qualification place in to the final.

Women

Qualifiers for the latter rounds (Q) of all events were decided on a time only basis, therefore positions shown are overall results versus competitors in all heats.
* – Indicates athlete swam in the preliminaries but not in the final race.

Table tennis

On 5 June Table Tennis England announced a squad of 10 for the games.

Singles

Doubles

Team

Triathlon

Individual

Mixed Relay

Weightlifting

On 30 May Commonwealth Games England announced the selection of a squad of 16 weightlifters and powerlifters.

Men

Women

Powerlifting

Wrestling

Commonwealth Games England announced a squad of 13 wrestlers on 8 June.

Men's freestyle

Women's freestyle

References

External links
Glasgow 2014 Commonwealth Games Official site
Commonwealth Games England Official site

England at the Commonwealth Games
Nations at the 2014 Commonwealth Games
2014 in English sport